Ail or AIL may refer to:

 Illness, a state of poor health
 Ail (Sailor Moon), a character in the Sailor Moon anime series
 Acceptance in lieu, an arrangement in the UK for accepting works of art etc. in lieu of tax
 Agilus, a Frankish abbot and saint
 Automotive Industries Ltd., a motor vehicle manufacturer of Israel
 American Income Life Insurance Company, a life insurance company in America
 Ail, a rare name for garlic (ail is French for garlic)
 All-Ireland League (rugby union)
Aimele language, of Papua New Guinea (language code "ail")
 Artificial Intelligence Laboratory (disambiguation), various research institutes
 Accademia Italiana di Lingua, Italian language and culture association
 Army Institute of Law, an Indian law school
 Animation International Ltd.
 Miles Sound System, formerly known as Audio Interface Library, a sound software development kit for video games

See also
 Ale (disambiguation)
 Aul
 Saint-Ail
 Yaman-Ail'